Labuda or Łabuda (Slovak feminine: Labudová) is a surname. Notable people with the surname include: 

 Aneta Łabuda (born 1995), Polish handball player
 Barbara Labuda (born 1946), Polish politician
 Dušan Labuda, a founder of Slovak metal band Kalijuge
 Frank LaBuda, American politician and judge
 Gerard Labuda (born 1916), Polish historian
 Jeanne Labuda (born 1947), American politician
 Josef Labuda (born 1941), Slovak volleyball player
 Marián Labuda (1944–2018), Slovak actor
 Win Labuda (born 1938), German photographer

See also
 

Polish-language surnames
Slovak-language surnames